Boris Irving Bittker (November 28, 1916 – September 8, 2005) was an American legal scholar. A professor at Yale Law School, Bittker was a prolific author, writing many textbooks and over one hundred articles on tax law.

Born in Rochester, New York, Bittker attended Cornell University ('38) and Yale Law School ('41). After law school, Bittker clerked for Judge Jerome Frank of the United States Court of Appeals for the Second Circuit. From 1942 to 43 Bittker worked as an attorney for the Lend-Lease Administration in Washington, D.C.

On May 24, 1943, he joined the United States Army. During the next two years Bittker fought and was wounded in World War II, receiving a Purple Heart. He served with the 42nd Infantry Division in France.

Returning from Europe, Bittker returned to government service, working for the Office of the Alien Property Custodian. Bittker reluctantly returned to his alma mater as an assistant professor in 1946. Eventually he gained tenure in 1951, became a Southmayd Professor in 1958, and Sterling Professor of Law in 1970. He retired in 1983.

In 1973, Bittker wrote The Case for Black Reparations, inspired by SNCC leader James Forman, who in 1969 interrupted a church service to demand reparations for slavery. Bittker defended the spirit of Forman's appeal, but argued that a reparations lawsuit for school segregation had a stronger legal basis.

Bittker was also a dedicated environmentalist, serving as a trustee of the Natural Resources Defense Council.

Bittker was married to Anne (died on February 2, 1997) and had two children, Susan and Daniel.

Publications (selection)

References

Yale Law School obituary
YLS Mourns Death of Boris I. Bittker; Memorial Service Scheduled December 11
Anne Bittker Obituary, 2/27/97 The New York Times B10

External links
Boris I. Bittker papers (MS 1869). Manuscripts and Archives, Yale University Library. 

 

1916 births
2005 deaths
Writers from Rochester, New York
American legal writers
American legal scholars
Cornell University alumni
Yale Law School alumni
Yale Law School faculty
Scholars of tax law
Yale Sterling Professors
United States Army personnel of World War II
United States Army soldiers